Baie-Comeau Airport  is located  south southwest of Baie-Comeau, Quebec, near the St. Lawrence River.

Airlines and destinations

See also
Baie-Comeau Water Aerodrome
Baie-Comeau (Manic 1) Airport

References

External links

Buildings and structures in Baie-Comeau
Certified airports in Côte-Nord